The Flag of the Bryansk Oblast (Russian: Флаг Брянской области, Flag Bryanskoy oblasti), is the symbol of the Bryansk Oblast, a federal subject of Russia. It consists of a burgundy field defaced with the oblasts' coat of arms in the center. It was officially approved on November 5, 1998.

The flag's field is burgundy, the same color of the banners the Red Army and guerrilla fighters flew during the liberation of Bryansk in World War II.

The flag's ratio is 1:1.5.

References 

Flags of the federal subjects of Russia
Flag
Flags introduced in 1998